Allison Leigh Sumrall (born July 21, 1979) is an American voice actress working with ADV Films, Funimation, and Sentai Filmworks, known for her roles in the English-language dubs of anime series. She is a veteran of the former Masquerade Theatre and Generations Theatre in Houston, Texas, and received her education in performing arts from the University of Houston. In anime, she is known as the voice of Miia from Monster Musume, Mui Aiba from Magical Warfare, Kagura from Azumanga Daioh, Lilith Asami from Trinity Seven, Nana Astar Deviluke from the To Love Ru series, and Taiga Fujimura from the Fate/Kaleid liner Prisma Illya series.

Filmography

Anime

Film

Video games

References

External links
 
 

20th-century American actresses
21st-century American actresses
Actresses from Houston
American stage actresses
American voice actresses
Living people
University of Houston alumni
Year of birth missing (living people)